William White Inglis (2 March 1894 – 20 January 1968) was a Scottish footballer. His regular position was as a defender. He was born in Kirkcaldy. He played for Inverkeithing United, Kirkcaldy United, Raith Rovers, Sheffield Wednesday, Manchester United and Northampton Town. After retiring from playing, he returned to Manchester United as an assistant trainer for 27 years from 1934 to 1961. He died seven years later at the age of 73.

External links
Profile at StretfordEnd.co.uk
Profile at MUFCInfo.com

1894 births
1968 deaths
Scottish footballers
Association football fullbacks
Raith Rovers F.C. players
Manchester United F.C. players
Sheffield Wednesday F.C. players
Northampton Town F.C. players
Inverkeithing United F.C. players
Kirkcaldy United F.C. players